Marcel Amon-Tanoh (born November 25, 1951 Abidjan) is an Ivorian politician. He has served as the Minister of Foreign Minister of the Ivory Coast from 25 November 2016 until 19 March 2020, under President Alassane Ouattara.

In November 2016, President Ouattara dismissed then-Foreign Minister Albert Toikeusse Mabri and appointed Amon-Tanoh as interim foreign minister. Two months later, Oattara retained Amon-Tanoh as his permanent foreign minister as part of a January 2017 cabinet reshuffle. Amon-Tanoh resigned on 19 March 2020.

References

Living people
1951 births
Foreign Ministers of Ivory Coast
Democratic Party of Côte d'Ivoire – African Democratic Rally politicians
University of Paris alumni
People from Abidjan
Ivorian expatriates in France
21st-century Ivorian politicians